Chrysanthos Kyriazis (born ) is a retired Greek male volleyball player. He was part of the Greece men's national volleyball team at the 2002 FIVB Volleyball Men's World Championship in Argentina. He played for Olympiacos.

Clubs
  Olympiacos

References

External links
 profile, club career, info at greekvolley.gr (in Greek)
 profile  at fivb.org

1972 births
Living people
Greek men's volleyball players
Olympiacos S.C. players
Sportspeople from Preveza
PAOK V.C. players
Iraklis V.C. players